The Ebony Idol is a plantation literature novel by G. M. Flanders, first published in 1860. It is one of several pro-slavery novels written in the Southern United States in response to the 1852 abolitionist novel Uncle Tom's Cabin by Harriet Beecher Stowe.

The majority of these works, such as Aunt Phillis's Cabin (1852) and The Planter's Northern Bride (1854) attacked Stowe for her allegedly inaccurate depiction of slavery, and criticized other abolitionists.

Plot

The novel takes place in the fictional town of Minton in New England, inhabited entirely by white people, and where coloured people are almost unknown.

The local pastor, the Reverend Mr. Cary, converts to the cause of abolitionism, and arranges for a fugitive slave named Caesar to take up residence in the town, to act as an "ebony idol" for the respect and sympathy of the people of Minton.

Cary's social experiment, however, has disastrous consequences. Caesar's presence splits Minton between pro- and anti-slavery factions, and Cary himself is questioned on his motives for keeping Caesar at all. Practically overnight, Minton changes from a quiet paradise into a violent slum.

In time, Cary is visited by a slaveholder from the south, and under pressure from the townsfolk, agrees that Caesar leave Minton to work on the plantations of the South, restoring Minton to its original, idyllic condition.

Publication history

The Ebony Idol was published in 1860 by D. Appleton & Co. of New York City. Appleton & Co. had been responsible for the publication of several previous anti-Tom novels, including The Lofty and the Lowly, or Good in All and None All Good by Maria J. McIntosh in 1853.

References

External links
The Ebony Idol at the University of Virginia

1860 American novels
Anti-Tom novels
D. Appleton & Company books